QUICC (Quad Integrated Communications Controller). The original QUICC was the 68k-based Motorola 68360. It was followed by the PowerPC-based PowerQUICC, PowerQUICC II, PowerQUICC II+ and PowerQUICC III. Early chips used a separate RISC engine to control the serial interfaces, enhancing performance in these slower speed designs. The PQ2+ and PQ3 designs were the first in this family to offer Gigabit Ethernet speeds using more conventional ethernet controllers without the need for a RISC co-processor (there are some exceptions, such as the 832x bridge chips).

These chips have many integrated devices/controllers and were targeted at the Telecom industry, but are used in other applications as well. The technology has been the backbone of many Motorola Cellular Base stations. 

The PQ2+ chips have moved into other directions as well. Many designs now have SATA controllers for SAN based applications. But networking will always be their strength.

Every current Freescale PQ CPU/board comes with a working Linux environment. But Freescale continues to offer MQX (a true RTOS) for PPC on a growing basis.

References

External links
 MC68360 QUICC datasheet

68k microprocessors
Microcontrollers